The  is a Japanese railway line connecting Kasamatsu with Hashima within Gifu Prefecture. It is owned and operated by Nagoya Railroad (Meitetsu).

History
What is today the Meitetsu Takehana Line started when  opened the section of line from Shin-Kasamatsu (now Nishi-Kasamatsu) to Shin-Sakae (now Takehana) on June 25, 1921, electrified at 600 VDC. Takehana Railroad merged with Meitetsu, the present operator, on March 1, 1943.

The voltage was increased to 1500 VDC in 1962, and in 1982 the Hashima line opened. On October 1, 2001, the section of line between Egira Station and Ōsu Station closed.

Stations
It is described in conjunction with the Hashima line.

References
This article incorporates material from the corresponding article in the Japanese Wikipedia

Rail transport in Gifu Prefecture
Takehana Line
Railway lines opened in 1921
1067 mm gauge railways in Japan